Husain Ibn Muhammed Abdullah (born July 27, 1985) is a former American football free safety. He was signed by the Minnesota Vikings of the National Football League (NFL) as an undrafted free agent in 2008 and also played for the Kansas City Chiefs. He retired from the NFL after seven seasons due to multiple concussions sustained during his career and concern for his future health. Abdullah played college football at Washington State. He is the younger brother of former NFL safety Hamza Abdullah.

High school
Abdullah attended Pomona High School  and was most well known for his athletics. In high school, Abdullah received many honorable awards as he represented his school football team as captain. Abdullah is a defensive back and also is a contributor to the special teams unit as a kick returner. During Abdullah's sophomore year, he was awarded the team's defensive MVP and was nominated as rookie of the year. During his junior year, Abdullah won the All-Inland Valley award and as a senior, Abdullah stood as the number 9 ranked safety in the west coast.

Professional career

Minnesota Vikings

Abdullah was an undrafted rookie who later signed with the Minnesota Vikings. He served as a backup from 2008 to 2009. Before the 2010 season he was named the starting strong safety. The competition in the offseason and preseason was thought to be between Tyrell Johnson and Jamarca Sanford, but Abdullah won the job. During the 2011 season, Abdullah became the starting free safety, but a concussion (his fourth in 15 months) ended his season.

Kansas City Chiefs
After he returned from a year off, Abdullah accepted a one-year contract offer from the Chiefs, and played in all 16 games (starting 2) of the 2013 season; he also started the Chiefs' playoff game against Indianapolis, making 2 interceptions in that game to tie a team playoff record.

An unrestricted free agent after the season, Abdullah re-signed with the Chiefs on March 12, 2014.  During a Monday Night Football game on September 29, 2014 against the New England Patriots, Abdullah intercepted a pass, returning it for a touchdown. He was given a 15-yard unsportsmanlike conduct penalty for sliding on his knees, then bowing down and giving praise in Islamic salutation.  The next day, the NFL said the penalty was a misapplication of the relevant rule, and should not have been assessed. The penalty created much controversy on social media, including beyond America.

Retirement
Abdullah retired from football on March 28, 2016, citing concern over the five concussions he had accumulated during his career.  He later explained the decision further in an essay submitted to The Players Tribune.

Personal life
Abdullah is the son to Yusuf and Sa'eeda Johnwell. He lived in a very large family, one of 12 children. As a practicing Muslim, Abdullah observes fasting in Ramadan—even during the football season. He sat out the 2012–2013 season to make Hajj to Mecca with his brother Hamza Abdullah, who was also in the NFL. He is a member of the Alpha Lambda Mu fraternity, America's first and only Muslim fraternity.

References

External links

Kansas City Chiefs bio 

1985 births
Living people
Players of American football from Los Angeles
Minnesota Vikings players
Washington State Cougars football players
African-American Muslims
Kansas City Chiefs players
American football safeties
People from Pomona, California